Khirbet al-Tin Mahmoud (also spelled Khirbet at-Teen Mahmud) is a village in western Syria, administratively part of the Homs Governorate, east of Homs. Nearby localities include Khirbet al-Sawda to the northeast, al-Ghor al-Gharbiya to the north, Shin to the west and Khirbet Tin Nur to the south. According to the Central Bureau of Statistics (CBS), Khirbet al-Tin Mahmoud had a population of 866 in the 2004 census.

References

Populated places in Homs District